John Christopher Ould (born 19 May 1940) is a British boxer. He fought as Johnny Ould. He competed in the men's light heavyweight event at the 1960 Summer Olympics. In his first fight, he lost to Petar Spasov of Bulgaria by decision in the Round of 32.

Ould won the Amateur Boxing Association 1959 and 1960 light heavyweight title, when boxing out of the Fisher ABC.

References

External links
 

1940 births
Living people
British male boxers
Olympic boxers of Great Britain
Boxers at the 1960 Summer Olympics
Boxers from Greater London
Light-heavyweight boxers